Christos Gikas (born August 12, 1976 in Gjirokastër, Albania) is a retired amateur Greek Greco-Roman wrestler, who competed in the men's lightweight category. He won a silver medal in the 63-kg division at the 2001 Mediterranean Games in Tunis, Tunisia, and had been selected to the nation's Olympic wrestling team when Greece hosted the 2004 Summer Olympics in Athens. Gikas also trained as a member of the wrestling squad for Olympiacos in Athens, under his personal coach Aristidis Rubenyan.

Gikas qualified for his naturalized Greek squad in the men's 60 kg class at the 2004 Summer Olympics in Athens. He filled up an entry by the International Federation of Association Wrestling and the Hellenic Olympic Committee, as Greece received an automatic berth for being the host nation. In front of the home crowd inside Ano Liossia Olympic Hall, Gikas lost three straight matches each to Turkey's Şeref Tüfenk (0–5), eventual Olympic silver medalist Roberto Monzón of Cuba (0–7), and two-time Olympian Ali Ashkani of Iran (1–6), leaving him on the bottom of the prelim pool and placing twentieth in the final standings.

References

External links
 

1976 births
Living people
Olympic wrestlers of Greece
Wrestlers at the 2004 Summer Olympics
Olympiacos Wrestlers
Sportspeople from Gjirokastër
Sportspeople from Athens
Greek male sport wrestlers
Mediterranean Games silver medalists for Greece
Competitors at the 2001 Mediterranean Games
Mediterranean Games medalists in wrestling
21st-century Greek people